The visa policy of the Schengen Area is a component within the wider area of freedom, security and justice policy of the European Union. It applies to the Schengen Area and to other EU member states except Ireland. The visa policy allows nationals of certain countries to enter the Schengen Area via air, land or sea without a visa for stays of up to 90 days within a 180-day period. Nationals of certain other countries are required to have a visa either upon arrival or in transit.

The Schengen Area consists of 23 EU member states and four non-EU countries that are members of EFTA: Iceland, Liechtenstein, Norway and Switzerland. Bulgaria, Cyprus and Romania, while EU members, are not yet part of the Schengen Area but, nonetheless, have a visa policy that is partially based on the Schengen acquis.

Ireland has opted out of the Schengen Agreement and instead operates its own visa policy, as do certain overseas territories of Schengen member states.

Nationals of EU single market countries are not only visa-exempt but are legally entitled to enter and reside in each other's countries. However, their right to freedom of movement in each other's countries can be limited in a reserved number of situations, as prescribed by EU treaties.

Visa exemptions

Freedom of movement

  citizens
  Citizens of EFTA member states

Nationals of 'Annex II' countries and territories (visa waiver countries)
Since 2001, the European Union has issued a list of countries whose nationals need visas (Annex I) and a list of those who do not (Annex II). The two lists are also adopted by Bulgaria, Cyprus and Romania, even though the three countries are not yet part of the Schengen Area.

Nationals of the following countries and territories holding ordinary passports may enter the Schengen Area, Bulgaria, Cyprus and Romania without a visa, for short stays (usually 90 days within a 180-day period):

Residents and holders of visas of Schengen states
Holders of a long-stay visa or residence permit issued by a Schengen state or Monaco may also travel to other Schengen states, without an additional visa, for a stay of up to 90 days in any 180-day period. Short-stay visas issued by a Schengen state are also valid for all other Schengen states unless marked otherwise.

Holders of a visa (even if limited to a specific country) or residence permit issued by a Schengen state, Monaco, Bulgaria, Cyprus or Romania may also travel to Bulgaria, Cyprus and Romania without an additional visa, for a stay of up to 90 days in any 180-day period (except nationals of Turkey and Azerbaijan travelling to Cyprus, who still need a Cypriot visa). However, visas and residence permits issued by Bulgaria, Cyprus or Romania are not valid for travel to the Schengen Area.

Family members of EU single market nationals
Individuals of any nationality who are family members of EU single market nationals and are in possession of a residence card indicating their status are exempt from the requirement to hold a visa when entering the EU single market when they are accompanying their EU single market family member or are seeking to join them.

School pupils resident in the EU single market or Annex II countries and territories

Refugees and stateless people resident in Ireland or Annex II countries and territories

Holders of local border traffic permits
Currently the local border traffic regulation agreements exist with Belarus (with Latvia since 2011), Moldova (with Romania since 2010), Russia (with Norway since 2012, with Latvia since 2013 and Poland 2012-2016) and Ukraine (with Hungary and Slovakia since 2008, Poland since 2009 and Romania since 2015). Agreement between Croatia and Bosnia and Herzegovina is pending ratification but is applied on provisional basis.

Holders of non-ordinary passports
There are no common visa lists for holders of diplomatic, service and other official passports. States may still maintain different policies on these.

Airport transit
In general, a passenger who transits through one single airport in the Schengen Area, Bulgaria, Cyprus and Romania while remaining airside in the international transit area less than one day will not require a visa (transit privilege). This only applies if the transfer is possible without leaving the international transit area, which depends on the connecting flight and airport layout.

However, on 5 April 2010, common visa requirements for airport transit were introduced by the European Union. Nationals of the following 12 countries are required to hold an airport transit visa (ATV) when transiting through any airport in the Schengen Area, Bulgaria, Cyprus or Romania, even if they remain airside:

However, nationals of the above countries are exempt from airport transit visas if they hold a visa or residence permit issued by an EU single market country, Andorra, Canada, Japan, Monaco, San Marino or the United States, are family members of an EU single market national, hold a diplomatic passport, or are flight crew members.

Additionally, individual Schengen countries can impose airport transit visa requirements for nationals of other countries in urgent cases of mass influx of illegal immigrants. For example, nationals of Syria need ATVs for many but not all Schengen countries.

Visas

Schengen visas can be issued by any member state of the Schengen Area. Travellers must apply to the embassy or consulate of the country which they intend to visit. In cases of travellers visiting multiple countries in the Schengen Area, travellers must apply to their main destination's embassy or consulate. If the main destination cannot be determined, the traveller should apply for the visa at the embassy of the Schengen member state of first entry. Often, external service providers are contracted by certain diplomatic missions to process, collect and return visa applications.

Schengen visa applications may not be submitted more than six months prior to the proposed date of entry into the Schengen Area. All countries' embassies may require applicants to provide biometric identifiers (ten fingerprints and a digital photograph) as part of the visa application process to be stored on the Visa Information System (VIS). Biometric identifiers are not collected from children under the age of 12. Travellers applying for a Schengen visa for the first time must apply in person and are subject to an interview by the consular officers. If biometric identifiers have been provided within the past 59 months, the applicant may not be required to provide biometric identifiers again. Providing that the visa application is admissible and there are no issues with the application, a decision must be given within 15 calendar days of the date on which the application was lodged.

The standard application fee for a Schengen visa is EUR 80. There is a reduced application fee of EUR 40 for children aged 6 to 12. The visa application fee may be waived or reduced in order to 'promote cultural or sporting interests, interests in the field of foreign policy, development policy and other areas of vital public interest, or for humanitarian reasons or because of international obligations'. Where an application is submitted to an external service provider, an additional service fee may have to be paid.

Schengen visas are valid for any country in the Schengen Area unless marked otherwise. Bulgaria, Cyprus and Romania also accept Schengen visas (even if limited to a specific country), as well as visas issued by each other, for stays of up to 90 days in a 180-day period (except for nationals of Turkey and Azerbaijan travelling to Cyprus). However, visas issued by Bulgaria, Cyprus or Romania are not valid for travel to the Schengen Area.

The Schengen Convention and Schengen Borders Code permit member states to require third-country nationals to report their presence to a police station within 3 working days of crossing an internal border. This requirement varies by country and can usually be performed by hotels instead.

The European Commission is planning to introduce a single online visa application platform at the EU level, replacing the separated national platforms. The platform will be built by eu-LISA and is scheduled to be introduced in 2026. A transition period for all member states to migrate to the single platform is scheduled to last until 2031.

Visa facilitation agreements
The EU has concluded visa facilitation agreements with several countries, which allow facilitated procedures for issuing visas for both EU citizens and nationals of partner countries. The facilitated procedures include faster visa processing times, reduced or no fees, and reduced list of supporting documents. These agreements are also linked to readmission agreements that allow the return of people irregularly residing in the EU.

At the border
In exceptional cases, single-entry Schengen visas valid for up to 15 days may be issued on arrival at the border. These visas are reserved for individuals who can prove that they were unable to apply for a visa in advance due to time constraints arising out of 'unforeseeable' and 'imperative' reasons as long as they fulfil the regular criteria for the issuing of a Schengen visa. However, if the individual requesting a Schengen visa at the border falls within a category of people for which it is necessary to consult one or more of the central authorities of other Schengen States, they may only be issued a visa at the border in exceptional cases on humanitarian grounds, on grounds of national interest or on account of international obligations (such as the death or sudden serious illness of a close relative or of another close person). In 2017, about 89,000 Schengen visas were issued to travellers on arrival at the border. People trying this way to travel to the Schengen Area can be denied boarding by the airline because of the carrier's responsibility, which penalises airlines if they carry passengers who do not have the correct documentation.

Visas with limited territorial validity
In exceptional cases, Schengen states may issue visas with limited territorial validity (LTV), either specifically naming the state(s) for which it is valid or, inversely, the state(s) for which it is not valid. Holders of LTV visas are only permitted to travel to Schengen states for which it is valid, as well as to Bulgaria, Cyprus and Romania.

According to the Schengen Visa Code, member states may issue LTV visas when a consulate deems it justifiable to overcome the three-month limitation in six months, when a member state considers it necessary due to pressing circumstances to derogate from entry conditions as set by Schengen Borders Code, to overcome objections of other member states, or in cases of urgency.

Unrecognised travel documents
Schengen visas are only issued on travel documents of UN member states, Kosovo, Palestine, Taiwan, Vatican City, the Order of Malta, and certain international organisations (Council of Europe, EU, NATO, Red Cross, UN). Belgium and France also accept the passport of Somaliland. Passports of Abkhazia, Artsakh, Northern Cyprus, South Ossetia, Transnistria and Western Sahara are not accepted.

Statistics
Most Schengen visas were issued to applicants located in the countries listed below (listed if more than 100,000 visas issued in most recent year). Applicants were not necessarily nationals of these countries.

Future changes

Visa exemptions
     – In 2022, the EU Council proposed a visa exemption for nationals of all countries of the Gulf Cooperation Council that were not yet exempt.
 – In 2022, the EU Parliament proposed a visa exemption for nationals of Ecuador.
 – In 2022, the EU Council proposed implementing the visa liberalisation for nationals of Kosovo on 1 January 2024 at the latest, or at the same time as ETIAS if earlier.
 – A visa waiver agreement between the EU and Vanuatu was suspended on 4 May 2022 and set to resume on 4 August 2024.

Entry/Exit System

In 2017, the EU adopted a regulation to establish an Entry/Exit System (EES) to record electronically the entry and exit of third-country nationals to and from the Schengen Area in a central database, replacing the manual stamping of passports. The goals are to increase automation of border control and to identify overstayers. As of February 2023, EES is expected to enter into operation in 2023.

The EU also plans to establish a Registered Traveller Programme that would allow pre-screened travellers easier access.

ETIAS

The European Travel Information and Authorisation System (ETIAS) is a planned electronic authorisation system for visa-exempt visitors to travel to the Schengen Area and to other EU member states, except Ireland, which remains in the Common Travel Area with the United Kingdom and other British Islands.

The implementation of ETIAS has been postponed several times. As of 2023, it is expected to become operational in 2024, with 6-month grace period to allow travellers and staff to become familiar with the new system. Prospective visitors will need to complete an online application and a €7 fee must be paid by those aged 18 to 70. ETIAS is expected to process the vast majority of applications automatically by searching in electronic databases and then provide an immediate response but, in some limited cases, it may take up to 30 days.

Single visa application platform 
The European Commission is planning to introduce a single online visa application platform at the EU level, replacing the separated national platforms. The platform will be built by eu-LISA and is scheduled to be introduced in 2026. A transition period for all member states to migrate to the single platform is scheduled to last until 2031. The proposal was approved by the European Parliament Committee on Civil Liberties, Justice and Home Affairs in February 2023 by a margin of 34-5. The Parliament has started to negotiate with the European Council on implementation.

Reciprocity

The EU requires that all Annex II countries and territories provide visa-free access for 90 days or longer to nationals of all Schengen states and other EU countries implementing the common visa rules (Bulgaria, Cyprus and Romania, but not Ireland). If an Annex II country is found to not provide full reciprocity, the EU may decide to suspend the visa exemption for certain categories or later all nationals of that country.

Since the adoption of this policy, full reciprocity has been achieved with all Annex II countries except the United States, which,  requires visas from nationals of Bulgaria, Cyprus and Romania. In November 2014, the Bulgarian government announced that it would not ratify the Transatlantic Trade and Investment Partnership unless the United States lifted visa requirements for its nationals. Since the United States failed to lift the requirements, on 3 March 2017 the European Parliament approved a non-binding resolution calling on the European Commission to revoke the visa-free travel for US nationals to the Schengen Area.

Some Annex II countries and territories also impose minor restrictions on nationals of EU or Schengen states that are not considered a breach of reciprocity by the EU. Australia, Canada, New Zealand, South Korea and the United States require an electronic authorisation before travel, similar to the EU's own planned ETIAS. Canada also requires a visa from nationals of Romania not holding electronic passports. Israel requires a visa from nationals of Germany born before 1928, which is issued free of charge if they were not involved with the Nazi Party. Montserrat requires an electronic visa from nationals of Croatia. The United States also requires a visa from nationals of Hungary born outside Hungary.

Stays exceeding 90 days
In general, third-country nationals staying more than 90 days in the Schengen Area as a whole or in Bulgaria, Cyprus or Romania require either a long-stay visa for less than a year or a residence permit for longer periods.

Although long-stay visas issued by these countries have a uniform design, the procedures and conditions for issuing them are usually determined by each individual country. For example, some Schengen countries require applications for long-stay visas to be made in the applicant's home country, while other Schengen countries permit them after arrival. Some procedures may vary depending on the applicant's country as well. In some situations, such as for study, the procedures and conditions for long-stay visas have been harmonised among all issuing states. Each country is also free to establish its own conditions for residence permits.

Third-country nationals who are long-term residents of an EU or Schengen state (except Ireland and Denmark) may also acquire the right to move to and settle in another of these states without losing their legal status and social benefits. The Van Der Elst visa rule allows third-country nationals employed in the EU single market to work temporarily in another EU single market country for the same employer under certain conditions.

Bilateral visa waivers
Some third-country nationals are permitted to stay in the Schengen Area for more than 90 days without the need to apply for a long-stay visa. For example, France does not require nationals of the European microstates to apply for a long-stay visa.

Nationals of some 'Annex II' countries (such as Australia, Canada, Malaysia, New Zealand, Singapore and the United States) that had entered into visa waiver agreements with individual Schengen states before they implemented the Schengen agreement are permitted to stay for an additional period of time, above and beyond the typical maximum stay limit of 90 days within 180 days imposed on visa-free 'Annex II' nationals. In such instances, the period of additional stay depends on the specific visa waiver agreement, and only applies if the 'Annex II' national has used up their maximum stay limit as provided for under the Schengen Area.

Means of subsistence
In addition to general requirements, Schengen states also set entry conditions for foreign nationals of countries outside the EU single market called the "reference amounts required for the crossing of the external border fixed by national authorities" regarding means of subsistence during their stay.

Visa policies of Ireland and overseas territories

Ireland has an independent visa policy. It grants visa-free entry to all Schengen Annex II nationalities, except for Albania, Bosnia and Herzegovina, Colombia, East Timor, Georgia, Marshall Islands, Mauritius, Micronesia, Moldova, Montenegro, North Macedonia, Palau, Peru, Serbia and Venezuela. It also grants visa-free entry to several additional countries Belize, Bolivia, Botswana, Eswatini, Fiji, Guyana, Lesotho, Maldives, Nauru and South Africa. Visas for Ireland and for the Schengen Area are not valid for each other. Ireland is part of the Common Travel Area and maintains freedom of movement with the United Kingdom in addition to with EU and Schengen countries.

The British overseas territory of Akrotiri and Dhekelia has open borders with Cyprus and follows the visa policy of the Schengen Area, but requires permits for stays longer than 28 days per 12-month period. These rules were not affected by Brexit.

Overseas France and the Caribbean part of the Kingdom of the Netherlands have individual visa policies that are mostly aligned with the Schengen Area, with some exceptions and additions.

The Faroe Islands and Greenland have the same list of nationalities exempt from visas as the Schengen Area, and arrivals from the Schengen Area are not subject to border checks. However, Schengen visas are not valid there, so nationalities that are not exempt need separate visas for these territories. These regulations are due to a special agreement under the Nordic Passport Union.

Svalbard is an entirely visa-free zone. Travellers to and from Svalbard must present a passport or national ID card. Travellers who need a visa for the Schengen Area must have such visa if they travel to Svalbard via mainland Norway, and this must be a double-entry visa if they also return from Svalbard via mainland Norway.

Visa policies of candidate and applicant states
Countries applying to join the European Union are obliged to adopt the EU's visa policy no later than three months before they formally join the Union. Schengen countries give visa-free access to nationals of all EU candidate and applicant states except Kosovo and Turkey. Candidate states Albania, Bosnia and Herzegovina, Moldova, Montenegro and North Macedonia, and applicant state Kosovo maintain similar visa policies as the Schengen Area, with some notable exceptions regarding countries that were added to the Schengen Annex II more recently and additional nationalities not listed in Annex II. Candidate states Serbia, Turkey and Ukraine, and applicant state Georgia require visas from some nationalities that have always been in Annex II and also maintain visa exemptions for some additional nationalities not in Annex II. Turkey also requires visas from nationals of EU member state Cyprus.

Validity for other countries
Schengen visas that are valid for further travel are accepted as substitute visas for national visas in several other countries.

See also

eu-LISA
 European Travel Information and Authorisation System
 Common Travel Area
 Central America-4 Border Control Agreement
 Foreign relations of the European Union
 Long-term resident (European Union)
 Trans-Tasman Travel Arrangement
 Visa Information System
 Visa policy of Ireland
 Visa policy of Northern Cyprus
 Visa policies of Overseas France
 Visa policy of the Kingdom of the Netherlands in the Caribbean
 Visa policy of Svalbard
 Visa requirements for European Union citizens

Notes

References

External links

 Regulation EU 2018/1806
 Visa requirements for entering Ireland

Transport and the European Union
Foreign relations of the European Union
European Union
Schengen
Schengen Area

de:Visum#Visa nach dem Recht der Europäischen Union (Schengen-Recht)